Education in Maine consists of public and private schools in Maine, including the University of Maine System, the Maine Community College System, private colleges, and secondary and primary schools.

Department of Education

The Maine Department of Education (DOE) administers public education in the state. It is run by a commissioner appointed by the governor. It concerns itself with academics. It does not concern itself with what public school staff does to their students. Local municipalities and their respective school districts operate individual public elementary and secondary schools but the DOE audits performance of these schools. The DOE also makes recommendations to state leaders concerning education spending and policies.

Primary and secondary schools

Education is compulsory from kindergarten through the twelfth grade, commonly but not exclusively divided into three tiers of primary and secondary education: elementary school, middle school or junior high school and high school.

Standards
The state is participating in a 30-state Common Core State Standards Initiative and assessment of students to replace the New England NECAP test. The state intends to use the new standards by 2015. The test will be given in grades 3-8 and at the end of grade 11 (junior year).

Public school districts

Maine has four types of school departments: the first is a local school, one which serves only one municipality, and is headed by a superintendent. Usually, it serves kindergarten through grade 12, although some only go to grade 8. Usually, independent school districts which do not have a high school are not totally independent; they are part of a school union, the second type of school district.

A school union is two or more school departments that share a superintendent but nothing else; each town has an independent school board. Usually, only one of the schools in the school union has a high school, but unlike MSADs (discussed below), students in the whole school union are not compelled to attend that school. School union students are given a choice of neighboring school districts, and the school union pays for the student's tuition.

The third type is a MSAD (Maine School Administrative District). This is a regional school district that incorporates two or more towns into one school department with one high school and middle school. These towns do not have independent school boards, but instead have one central board governing the entire district. Students are obligated to attend the central high school. Usually, a MSAD comprises one larger town and one or more smaller towns. The larger town is equipped with a high school and middle school, while the surrounding towns have elementary schools as well, but no secondary schools. The elementary schools usually cut off after grade 5 or grade 6. Sometimes, towns in a MSAD do not have an elementary school but possess a high school and/or middle school, whereas the surrounding towns have the elementary schools.

The last type of school district is a CSD (Community School District, sometimes called a Consolidated School District). This usually (but not always) exists in school districts with such a small student population between several towns that the school district cannot justify an elementary school outside the largest town in the district. In rare cases a CSD refers to only a high school of a school union. Sometimes, in towns geographically isolated (such as island towns) the entire student population attends one school grades PK–12.

Students can choose to attend a school in another district if the parents agree to pay the school tuition. Vocational centers are usually regional, so one school department will administer a technical center but other school districts will transport their students there to take classes.

Private schools
Private schools are less common than public schools. A large number of private elementary schools with under 20 students exist, but most private high schools in Maine can be perceived as "semi-private." This means that while it costs money to send children there, towns will make a contract with a school to take children from a town or MSAD at a slightly reduced rate. Often this is done when it is deemed cheaper to subsidize private tuition than build a whole new school when a private one already exists.

In addition to the many private elementary schools, there are several well-known private high schools and K-12 schools including Fryeburg Academy, Waynflete School, Berwick Academy, and Cheverus High School.

Magnet schools
Maine has one major magnet school: The Maine School of Science and Mathematics in Limestone. Another specialty public school exists in Portland: the Maine School of Performing Arts.

Colleges and universities

Notes

External links
 Maine Department of Education
2008 AP test results - College Board press release